Darren Turner (born 13 April 1974) is a British professional racing driver and owner of Base Performance Simulators. He races for Aston Martin Racing as a factory driver and also works as a high performance test driver for Aston Martin.

He was McLaren Autosport BRDC Young Driver of the Year in 1996. He is a former test driver for the McLaren Formula One team, but has raced primarily in touring cars and sportscars since 2000. He spent 2 years in the DTM for Keke Rosberg's Mercedes-Benz-powered team, also winning several ASCAR races. In 2006 he raced sportscars for Aston Martin, but also competed five rounds of the British Touring Car Championship for SEAT, sharing their 2nd car with James Thompson. In his first drive for the team he finished 3rd.

He remained with the team for 2007, now full-time team-mate to Plato. Luck was again against him at Rockingham – after qualifying on pole the car had an electrical failure before race one. His first win came in race 11 at Croft  , with two more at Knockhill.

As well as driving for SEAT in the BTCC, Darren also competed in the 2007 Le Mans 24 Hours, competing in the GT1 class driving for Prodrive Aston Martin Racing alongside David Brabham and Rickard Rydell. After a tense fight against the Corvette Racing Corvette C6.R of Johnny O'Connell, Jan Magnussen and Ron Fellows, the Aston prevailed to win a Le Mans class race for the first time since the return of Aston Martin to endurance sportscar racing.

He opened his 2008 racing season by competing in the Rolex 24 finishing 4th in class and overall sharing a Krohn Racing Pontiac-Riley with Niclas Jonsson and Ricardo Zonta. At the 2008 24 Hours of Le Mans Turner won the GT1 class (13th overall) driving an Aston Martin DBR9 shared with David Brabham and Antonio García.

Turner also participated in the Gold Coast 600 race as part of the 2011 International V8 Supercars Championship. He entered the race as a replacement driver to Dan Wheldon, who was scheduled to drive in the race but was killed in a 15-car crash at the IndyCar World Championship race at the Las Vegas Motor Speedway, less than a week before the race.

In 2012, Turner competed in the 2012 FIA World Endurance Championship season with Aston Martin Racing in the GTE-Pro class Aston Martin Vantage.

In the 80th edition of the 24 Hours of Le Mans in 2012, Turner and the Aston Martin Racing finished third place in the GTE-Pro class along with his co-drivers the German Stefan Mücke and the Mexican Adrián Fernández, their Aston Martin Vantage 4.5 L-V8 covered a total of 332 laps (2,811.65 miles), in the Circuit de la Sarthe without failure or serious mechanical problems. Also the team achieved the fastest lap of the category with 3 minutes and 54.928 seconds.

Turner continued to race for Aston Martin Racing in the FIA World Endurance Championship until 2020, notching up numerous victories, the biggest of which was his third 24 Hours of Le Mans win, which came in 2017. He raced the #97 Aston Martin Vantage GTE to a class win in GTE Pro, alongside Jonny Adam and Daniel Serra. It was Turner who took the GTE pole position for the 2017 race with a time that broke the lap record.

Darren continues to race, competing in events including the Nürburgring 24 Hours.

As a high performance development driver for Aston Martin, Turner has worked on the development of cars including the Aston Martin Vulcan and the Aston Martin Valkyrie.

Turner is also a regular competitor at the Goodwood Revival and in 2018 he was named "Rolex Driver of the Meeting" in recognition of his performances at the event.

Racing record

Complete Deutsche Tourenwagen Masters results
(key) (Races in bold indicate pole position) (Races in italics indicate fastest lap)

24 Hours of Le Mans results

Complete British Touring Car Championship results
(key) (Races in bold indicate pole position – 1 point awarded in first race) (Races in italics indicate fastest lap – 1 point awarded all races) (* signifies that driver lead race for at least one lap – 1 point awarded all races)

Complete GT1 World Championship results

Complete V8 Supercar results

+ Not eligible for points.

Complete FIA World Endurance Championship results
(key) (Races in bold indicate pole position; races in
italics indicate fastest lap)

Complete IMSA SportsCar Championship results
(key) (Races in bold indicate pole position) (Races in italics indicate fastest lap)

Complete European Le Mans Series results

Complete British GT Championship results
(key) (Races in bold indicate pole position) (Races in italics indicate fastest lap)

† As Turner was a guest driver, he was ineligible to score points.

Complete Super GT results
(key) (Races in bold indicate pole position) (Races in italics indicate fastest lap)

References

External links

 
 
 Profile at BTCCPages.com

1974 births
Living people
English racing drivers
British Formula Renault 2.0 drivers
British Touring Car Championship drivers
FIA GT Championship drivers
Deutsche Tourenwagen Masters drivers
Auto GP drivers
British Formula Three Championship drivers
24 Hours of Le Mans drivers
Formula Palmer Audi drivers
24 Hours of Daytona drivers
American Le Mans Series drivers
European Le Mans Series drivers
FIA GT1 World Championship drivers
Supercars Championship drivers
FIA World Endurance Championship drivers
Blancpain Endurance Series drivers
WeatherTech SportsCar Championship drivers
24 Hours of Spa drivers
International GT Open drivers
ASCAR drivers
British GT Championship drivers
Team Rosberg drivers
Aston Martin Racing drivers
M2 Competition drivers
R-Motorsport drivers
Nürburgring 24 Hours drivers
Nismo drivers
Mercedes-AMG Motorsport drivers
Strakka Racing drivers
TOM'S drivers
Cupra Racing drivers